Sampath Kumar (18 September 1950 – 30 December 2009), known by his stage name Vishnuvardhan, was an Indian actor who worked predominantly in Kannada cinema besides also having sporadically appeared in Tamil, Hindi, Telugu and Malayalam language films. Vishnuvardhan has a prolific career spanning over four decades, during which he has acted in more than 220 films. A popular cultural icon of Karnataka, and holds the status of a matinée idol  amongst the Kannada diaspora. He is popularly called as Sahasa Simha, Dada and The Angry Young Man of Kannada Cinema. Vishnuvardhan's contributions to Kannada cinema have been praised by his contemporaries in the Indian film industry. The Government of Karnataka honoured him with the Rajyothsava Prashasthi in 1990 and the Dr. Rajkumar Lifetime Achievement Award in 2007 for his contributions to Kannada cinema. He was called The Phoenix of Indian Cinema by CNN-News18. In 2008, a poll conducted by CNN-IBN listed Vishnuvardhan as the most popular star in the Kannada film industry.

Vishnuvardhan made his acting and onscreen debut at age 21 in B. V. Karanth and Girish Karnad's Vamsha Vriksha in 1971. In 1972, he attained stardom after starring in Puttanna Kanagal's Naagarahaavu . By the late-1970s, he established himself as a bankable leading actor after starring several successful films throughout the 70's; the crime drama Sahasa Simha released in 1982 catapulted him into superstardom in Karnataka. He predominantly works in Kannada films, but he has also appeared in some of Hindi, Tamil, Telugu and Malayalam films. Some of his best known non-Kannada films include the Tamil mythological Sri Raghavendrar (1985) and the Malayalam crime thriller Kauravar (1992). He was also the story writer of the 1997 film Ganesha I Love You directed by Phani Ramachandra.

Vishnuvardhan has won six Filmfare Award South—four Best Actor and two Special Jury Mention, three Cinema Express Awards for Best Actor and eight Karnataka State Film Awards—seven Best Actor and one Dr. Rajkumar Lifetime Achievement Award. He has won the second most number of Best Actor awards at the Karnataka State Film Awards, behind Dr. Rajkumar. As an acknowledgment to his service to Indian cinema, the state government named its annual lifetime achievement award to long-serving film personalities after Vishnuvardhan, renaming it as the Karnataka State Dr. Vishnuvardhan Award. Vishnuvardhan was given the  Filmfare Lifetime Achievement Award - South in 2002 for his contribution to the Kannada film industry. A road stretching 14.5 kilometers (9.0 miles) from Banashankari Temple to Kengeri in Bangalore was named after him. It is the longest road in India to be named after an actor.

Early life
Vishnuvardhan was born in Mysore to H. L. Narayana Rao and Kamakshamma. His father was an artist, music composer and a screenwriter who was known for his collection of musical instruments and had written the story, screenplay, dialogues and lyrics for the 1962 Kannada movie Vidhivilasa. He had six siblings. His sister Rama was a Kathak dancer at the Mysore Palace, and brother Ravi was a child actor who appeared in the 1955 Tamil language - Kannada bilingual film Modala Thedi. Vishnuvardhan was educated first in Mysore's Gopalswamy School and then at Bangalore's Kannada Model High School. He attended high school and obtained a degree from National College, Basavanagudi, Bangalore.

Vishnuvardhan married actress Bharathi on 17 February 1975 in Bangalore. They have two daughters, Keerthi and Chandana. Actor Aniruddha Jatkar is his son in law.

Career

Early career and debut (1972 - 1980) 
In his 37-year career, he played a variety of roles in more than 200 films. Vishnuvardhan started his career with the National Award-winning movie Vamshavruksha (1972) directed by Girish Karnad based on the novel by S. L. Bhyrappa. His first lead role was in Naagarahaavu, directed by Puttanna Kanagal and based on a trilogy by T. R. Subba Rao. Next he appeared along with Rajkumar in Gandhada Gudi. Released in 1973, it was the highest-grossing Kannada movie of the year. In 1974 he appeared in Bhootayyana Maga Ayyu  which also went on to break box-office records. In 1977, he appeared in many Kannada movies of which three were with Rajinikanth who was then a budding star - Sahodarara Savaal, Kiladi Kittu and Galate Samsara. In 1978, Vishnuvardhan appeared in the hit romantic drama Hombisilu and his role of a doctor fetched him his first Karnataka State Film Award for Best Actor. He also acted in Kiladi Jodi with Srinath and Lakshmi. During the 70s Vishnuvardhan formed a successful pair with not only his actress wife Bharathi, but also the two top actresses of the decade - Aarathi and Manjula.

Later career and success (1981 - 1999) 
In 1982, the Joe Simon directed Sahasa Simha became a blockbuster and bestowed the title of Sahasa Simha on him. In 1984 he debuted in Bollywood with Ek Naya Itihas opposite Hema Malini. In the same year, Bandhana, where he appeared with Suhasini Maniratnam had him play a doctor again but as a dejected lover. The film was not only a blockbuster but also fetched him his second Karnataka State Film Award for Best Actor and became another turning point in his career. In 1985, he appeared with Rajinikanth in the Tamil film Sri Raghavendrar and the next year in the multi-starrer Viduthalai  co-starring Sivaji Ganesan as well. A number of his films in the 1980s like Onde Guri, Nee Bareda Kadambari, Jeevana Chakra, Khaidi, Suprabhaata, Deva and Hrudaya Geethe were successful at the box-office. Malaya Marutha in which he played a classical singer got him a lot of critical acclaim.

In 1990, Muthina Haara - the National award winning film ( 38th National Film Awards ) directed by S.V. Rajendra Singh Babu (who had earlier given him the blockbuster Bandhana) got him rave reviews but was an average grosser at the box office, while Mathe Haaditu Kogile where he costarred with Anant Nag for the first time became a super hit. In 1991,he appeared in a double role in Lion Jagapathi Rao for which he received yet his third Karnataka State Film Award for Best Actor. In 1992 he appeared in the National award winning film Harakeya Kuri directed by K. S. L. Swamy He made his debut in Malayalam cinema in 1981 with Adima Changala, Again in 1992 appeared in a Malayalam movie Kauravar, starring Mammootty in the lead role. The film was a commercial success and his performance in the film was critically acclaimed. Halunda Tavaru which released in 1994 was a blockbuster. In 1994, he once again forayed into Hindi cinema appearing in the Hindi-Kannada bilingual Vishnu Vijaya (titled Ashaant in Hindi) and Zaalim along with then rising star Akshay Kumar. Other significant movies in the late 1990s include Surya Vamsha, Habba and Laali. During this time, while he acted with almost all the notable actresses of the South industry, he formed the most successful pair with Madhavi, Bhavya, Suhasini, Rupini and Sithara.

In 2000s (2000 - 2010) 
In 2000 Yajamana was a huge box office success and became the all-time highest grossing Kannada movie. His other big hit that year was Soorappa. Over the next few years Vishnuvardhan continued to give more successful films like Kotigobba, Simhadriya Simha, Jamindaru, Diggajaru, Kadamba and most importantly Apthamitra which turned out to be the last film of Soundarya who costarred with him.  In 2007, Ee Bandhana costarring Jaya Prada directed by actress Vijayalakshmi Singh, and Maathaad Maathaadu Mallige directed by Nagathihalli Chandrashekhar co-starring Sudeepa(actor),got him a lot of acclaim for portraying him in age appropriate roles. He appeared in Neenello Naanalle with his son-in-law Aniruddha Jatkar and popular actress Rakshita. In 2009 Bellary Naga was his last movie to release before his death. Aptharakshaka (2010) which released posthumously became a huge blockbuster.

Television career
He appeared on television for the first time in the 1980s. Shankar Nag directed Malgudi Days and introduced Vishnuvardhan as the main character Venkat Rao, in an episode called Rupees Forty-five a Month. Here, his co-star was Gayatri Nag.

Philanthropy
Vishnuvardhan started an organisation called Sneha Loka to promote harmony and to help during calamities like floods. He conducted a padayatra to collect funds for the flood-affected people in the northern part of the state. Vishnuvardhan and his wife Bharathi had adopted the Melukote town in Mandya district where he had dug borewells in the water-starved temple town. Many of his other charitable donations were revealed only when the beneficiaries came forward and spoke about it. In January 2005, Vishnuvardhan, cricketer Syed Kirmani and Shivram participated in a Cancer Awareness Walkathon organised by Bangalore Institute of Oncology (BIO) to commemorate its 15 years of public service in Bangalore.

Frequent collaboration
S. P. Balasubrahmanyam
SPB started singing for Vishnuvardhan in the 1972 film Naagarahaavu. Balasubrahmanyam as music director, composed all the songs for Vishnuvardhan's Sowbhagyalakshmi. Balasubrahmanyam has sung all the five songs in his last Kannada film Aptharakshaka and was awarded the Best Playback Singer Filmfare Award for the song Gharane Ghara Gharane. He dedicated his award to Vishnuvardhan.
After Vishnuvardhan's death, Balasubrahmanyam paid tribute to him in musical nights.

H. R. Bhargava
Vishnuvardhan's pairing with director H.R. Bhargava is considered one of the best pairings of Kannada film industry. His first film with H.R. Bhargava was Asaadhya Aliya which was successful. He has a total of 23 films with H.R. Bhargava. To name a few are Guru Sishyaru, Jeevana Chakra, Karunamayi, Jana Naayaka, Hrudaya Geethe, Karna, Mathe Haditu Kogile, Onde Guri, Krishna Nee Begane Baaro, Shiva Shankar, Bangarada Kalasa.
Suhasini
Vishnuvardan's pair with actress Suhasini Maniratnam was one of the most lovable pairs in Karnataka.

Ramesh Bhat 
Bhat has acted in more than 75 films with Vishnuvardhan.

Prema 
In his later part of career, Vishnuvardan's pair with actress Prema was also successful. Their films include Ellaranthalla Nanna Ganda,Yajamana, Apthamithra

As singer
He started singing in movies occasionally and later went on to sing devotional songs for albums. The first song he sang was in the movie Nagarahole and he has recorded some duet songs with the notable legendary singers S. Janaki, Bangalore Latha, Vani Jairam and P. Susheela. The first devotional album sung by him was on Lord Ayappa and the title of the album was Jyothiroopa Ayappa. His other albums were "Thayi Bhanashankari" (on goddess Banashankari) and Vishwapremi Ayappa. He also sang devotional songs on Dharmastala's Lord Manjunathaswamy, Malemadeshwara and Ranachandi Chamundi.

Some of his renderings are:

Later years and death
On 30 December 2009, Vishnuvardhan died of a massive cardiac arrest at King's Court Hotel in Mysore. He was survived by his wife, Bharathi Vishnuvardhan, and their two daughters, Keerthi and Chandana. He was cremated with full state honours at Abhiman studio in Bangalore.

Legacy, awards and honors

Filmfare Award South : 
Best Actor - 4 Times :

Suprabhatha ( 1988 )
Haalunda Tavaru ( 1994 )
Yajamana (2000)
Apthamitra ( 2004 )

Filmfare Special Award - South - 2 times:

Naagarahaavu (1973)
Bandhana (1984)

 Filmfare Lifetime Achievement Award - South - 2002

Cinema Express Awards :

 Cinema Express Award for the Best Actor - Suprabhatha (1988)

 Cinema Express Award for the Best Actor - Rayaru Bandaru Mavana Manege (1993)

 Cinema Express Award for the Best Actor - Yajamana (2000)

Other Awards:

 Kaladevi Award (Chennai)

 Indira Prathishtan National Award

 Tarangini Barkley

Karnataka State Film Awards :

 VishnuVardhan received Karnataka Rajyothsava Prashasthi in 1990.
 He bagged Kerala Cultural & Art Award
 As an acknowledgment to his service to Indian cinema, the state government named its annual lifetime achievement award to long-serving film personalities after Vishnuvardhan, renaming it as the Karnataka State Dr. Vishnuvardhan Award.
 He has appeared on postage stamps issued by the Government of India posthumously.
 Vishnuvardhan was given the  Filmfare Lifetime Achievement Award - South in 2002 for his contribution to the Kannada film industry.
 The State Government has named roads and parks in the capital city Bangalore after him. A park in Jayanagar, Bengaluru has also been named as Dr. Vishnuvardhan Park.
 The government of Karnataka decided to build a film city in the name of Dr. Vishnuvardhan. It will be similar to the model of Ramoji Film City in Hyderabad.
 The Karnataka Assembly showed respect to the star by praying for a minute for his soul to rest in peace. After that, the election of the Speaker was held under chaotic circumstances as the Opposition parties wanted the elections to be postponed due to this shocking and unexpected incident.
 There are statues erected in his honour, especially in Bangalore. A  statue in Gowri Palya on 1 March 2012, Laggere on 4 March 2012, Kengeri on 9 October 2011, KP Agrahara in Vijayanagar on 11 March 2012 and in other places of Bengaluru and Karnataka were unveiled.
 Vishnuvardhan was cremated at the Abhimaan Studios, in the outskirts of Bangalore on 30 December 2009 with full state honors. Almost all the leading politicians and actors were present there.
 A 14.3 km-long stretch of road between the Banashankari Temple and Kengeri in Bangalore has been named after the superstar. It is the longest road in Asia to be named after a celebrity.
 Vishnuvardhan's fans, for whom he is a demi-god, have built a temple for him naming it Dr. Vishnuvardhan Mandir.
 He was called The Phoenix of Indian Cinema.

Filmography

References

External links

 
 

Indian male film actors
Male actors in Kannada cinema
Male actors from Mysore
1950 births
2009 deaths
Kannada people
Kannada playback singers
Kannada male actors
Male actors in Malayalam cinema
Filmfare Awards South winners
Male actors in Tamil cinema
20th-century Indian male actors
20th-century Indian singers
Indian male television actors
Singers from Mysore